Dabiele Lake, also known by other names, is an ephemeral lake in the southwestern Qarhan Playa north of Golmud in the Haixi Prefecture of Qinghai Province in northwestern China. It is fed by the Tuolahai and Qingshui Rivers from the Kunlun Mountains to the south. Like the other lakes of the surrounding Qaidam Basin, it is extremely saline; like the other lakes in the Bieletan subbasin, it is rich in lithium.

Names
The da at the beginning of the name is the pinyin romanization of the Chinese word for "big" or "greater", distinguishing it from nearby Xiaobiele Lake ("Little" or "Lesser Biele Lake"). Dabiele is also known as Bieletan or Dabieletan, from a Chinese word used for both beaches and muddy riverbanks.

Geography
It lies between Suli and Xiaobiele Lakes. It is fed from the south by the Tuolahai  Tuōlāhài Hé) and Qingshui Rivers  Qīngshuǐ Hé). Its depth usually does not exceed .

Geology
Dabiele's position at the south end of the playa means that its waters are relatively less influenced by the concentrated mineral springs along the playa's northern boundary. As with Xiaobiele, it is nonetheless nearly saturated with calcite, anhydrite, halite, and (importantly) carnallite, which is processed to produce potash for potassium-rich fertilizers and other uses.

The lithium derives from hot springs located near Mount Buka Daban which now feed the Narin Gol River or Hongshui River   Hóngshuǐ Hé) that flows into East Taijinar Lake. In the past, however, the springs lay within the "Kunlun" paleolake which until about 30,000 years ago produced a river which flowed north into a broad alluvial fan feeding the "Qarhan" paleolake in the Sanhu area. Bieletan's lithium came both from deposits directly flowing into the area at the time and continuing contributions from the Urt Moron and other rivers arising in and flowing through the former alluvial plain.

See also
 Qarhan Playa & Qaidam Basin
 List of lakes and saltwater lakes of China

References

Citations

Bibliography
 .
 .
 .
 .
 .

Lakes of China
Lakes of Qinghai
Haixi Mongol and Tibetan Autonomous Prefecture